George Gasper is a mathematician at Northwestern University working on special functions, especially orthogonal polynomials and basic hypergeometric series,  who introduced the Askey–Gasper inequality.

Publications

References
George Gasper's Home Page

21st-century American mathematicians
Northwestern University faculty
Living people
Year of birth missing (living people)